Air traffic control (ATC) is a service provided by ground-based air traffic controllers (also called control tower operators (CTO)) who direct aircraft on the ground and through a given section of controlled airspace, and can provide advisory services to aircraft in non-controlled airspace. The primary purpose of ATC worldwide is to prevent collisions, organize and expedite the flow of air traffic, and provide information and other support for pilots.

Air traffic controllers monitor the location of aircraft in their assigned airspace by radar and communicate with the pilots by radio. To prevent collisions, ATC enforces traffic separation rules, which ensure each aircraft maintains a minimum amount of empty space around it at all times. In many countries, ATC provides services to all private, military, and commercial aircraft operating within its airspace. Depending on the type of flight and the class of airspace, ATC may issue instructions that pilots are required to obey, or advisories (known as flight information in some countries) that pilots may, at their discretion, disregard. The pilot in command is the final authority for the safe operation of the aircraft and may, in an emergency, deviate from ATC instructions to the extent required to maintain safe operation of their aircraft.

Language

Pursuant to requirements of the International Civil Aviation Organization (ICAO), ATC operations are conducted either in the English language or the language used by the station on the ground. In practice, the native language for a region is used; however, English must be used upon request.

History
In 1920, Croydon Airport, London, was the first airport in the world to introduce air traffic control. It was commissioned on February 25, 1920 and provided basic traffic, weather and location information to pilots.

In the United States, air traffic control developed three divisions. The first of several air mail radio stations (AMRS) was created in 1922 after World War I when the U.S. Post Office began using techniques developed by the Army to direct and track the movements of reconnaissance aircraft. Over time, the AMRS morphed into flight service stations. Today's flight service stations do not issue control instructions, but provide pilots with many other flight related informational services. They do relay control instructions from ATC in areas where flight service is the only facility with radio or phone coverage. The first airport traffic control tower, regulating arrivals, departures and surface movement of aircraft at a specific airport, opened in Cleveland in 1930. Approach/departure control facilities were created after adoption of radar in the 1950s to monitor and control the busy airspace around larger airports. The first air route traffic control center (ARTCC), which directs the movement of aircraft between departure and destination, was opened in Newark in 1935, followed in 1936 by Chicago and Cleveland. Currently in the U.S., the Federal Aviation Administration (FAA) operates  22 ARTCCs.

After the 1956 Grand Canyon mid-air collision, killing all 128 on board, the FAA was given the air-traffic responsibility over the United States in 1958, and this was followed by other countries.
In 1960, Britain, France, Germany and the Benelux countries set up Eurocontrol, intending to merge their airspaces.
The first and only attempt to pool controllers between countries is the Maastricht Upper Area Control Centre (MUAC), founded in 1972 by Eurocontrol and covering Belgium, Luxembourg, the Netherlands and north-western Germany. In 2001, the EU aimed to create a "Single European Sky", hoping to boost efficiency and gain economies of scale.

Airport traffic control tower  

The primary method of controlling the immediate airport environment is visual observation from the airport control tower. The tower is a tall, windowed structure located on the airport grounds. Air traffic controllers are responsible for the separation and efficient movement of aircraft and vehicles operating on the taxiways and runways of the airport itself, and aircraft in the air near the airport, generally 5 to 10 nautical miles (9 to 18 km) depending on the airport procedures. A controller must carry out the job using the precise and effective application of rules and procedures that, however, need flexible adjustments according to differing circumstances, often under time pressure. In a study that compared stress in the general population and this kind of system markedly showed more stress level for controllers. This variation can be explained, at least in part, by the characteristics of the job.

Surveillance displays are also available to controllers at larger airports to assist with controlling air traffic. Controllers may use a radar system called secondary surveillance radar for airborne traffic approaching and departing. These displays include a map of the area, the position of various aircraft, and data tags that include aircraft identification, speed, altitude, and other information described in local procedures. In adverse weather conditions, the tower controllers may also use surface movement radar (SMR), surface movement guidance and control system (SMGCS), or advanced surface movement guidance and control system (ASMGCS) to control traffic on the maneuvering area (taxiways and runway).

The areas of responsibility for tower controllers fall into three general operational disciplines: local control or air control, ground control, and flight data/clearance delivery—other categories, such as airport apron control or ground movement planner, may exist at extremely busy airports. While each tower may have unique airport-specific procedures, such as multiple teams of controllers at major or complex airports with multiple runways, the following provides a general concept of the delegation of responsibilities within the tower environment.

Remote and virtual tower (RVT) is a system based on air traffic controllers being located somewhere other than at the local airport tower and still able to provide air traffic control services. Displays for the air traffic controllers may be live video, synthetic images based on surveillance sensor data, or both.

Ground control  

Ground control (sometimes known as ) is responsible for the airport  areas, as well as areas not released to the airlines or other users. This generally includes all taxiways, inactive runways, holding areas, and some transitional aprons or intersections where aircraft arrive, having vacated the runway or departure gate. Exact areas and control responsibilities are clearly defined in local documents and agreements at each airport. Any aircraft, vehicle, or person walking or working in these areas is required to have clearance from ground control. This is normally done via VHF/UHF radio, but there may be special cases where other procedures are used. Aircraft or vehicles without radios must respond to ATC instructions via aviation light signals or else be led by vehicles with radios. People working on the airport surface normally have a communications link through which they can communicate with ground control, commonly either by handheld radio or even cell phone. Ground control is vital to the smooth operation of the airport because this position impacts the sequencing of departure aircraft, affecting the safety and efficiency of the airport's operation.

Some busier airports have surface movement radar (SMR), such as ASDE-3, AMASS, or ASDE-X, designed to display aircraft and vehicles on the ground. These are used by ground control as an additional tool to control ground traffic, particularly at night or in poor visibility. There is a wide range of capabilities on these systems as they are being modernized. Older systems will display a map of the airport and the target. Newer systems include the capability to display higher-quality mapping, radar targets, data blocks, and safety alerts, and to interface with other systems such as digital flight strips.

Air control or local control  

Air control clears aircraft for takeoff or landing, ensuring that prescribed runway separation will exist at all times. If the air controller detects any unsafe conditions, a landing aircraft may be instructed to "go-around" and be re-sequenced into the landing pattern. This re-sequencing will depend on the type of flight and may be handled by the air controller, approach, or terminal area controller.

Within the tower, a highly disciplined communications process between the air control and ground control is an absolute necessity. Air control must ensure that ground control is aware of any operations that will impact the taxiways, and work with the approach radar controllers to create  in the arrival traffic to allow taxiing traffic to cross runways and to allow departing aircraft to take off. Ground control needs to keep the air controllers aware of the traffic flow towards their runways to maximise runway utilisation through effective approach spacing. Crew resource management (CRM) procedures are often used to ensure this communication process is efficient and clear. Within ATC, it is usually known as TRM (team resource management) and the level of focus on TRM varies within different ATC organisations.

Flight data and clearance delivery  

Clearance delivery is the position that issues route clearances to aircraft, typically before they commence taxiing. These clearances contain details of the route that the aircraft is expected to fly after departure. At busy airports, these releases are often automatic and are controlled by local agreements allowing "free-flow" departures. When weather or extremely high demand for a certain airport or airspace becomes a factor, there may be ground "stops" (or "slot delays") or re-routes may be necessary to ensure the system does not get overloaded. The primary responsibility of clearance delivery is to ensure that the aircraft has the correct aerodrome information, such as weather and airport conditions, the correct route after departure, and time restrictions relating to that flight. This information is also coordinated with the relevant radar center or flow control unit and ground control to ensure that the aircraft reaches the runway in time to meet the time restriction provided by the relevant unit.

Flight data (which is routinely combined with clearance delivery) is the position that is responsible for ensuring that both controllers and pilots have the most current information: pertinent weather changes, outages, airport ground delays/ground stops, runway closures, etc.

Approach and terminal control

Many airports have a radar control facility that is associated with the airport. In most countries, this is referred to as terminal control and abbreviated to TMC; in the U.S., it is referred to as a TRACON (terminal radar approach control). While every airport varies, terminal controllers usually handle traffic in a  radius from the airport. Where there are many busy airports close together, one consolidated terminal control center may service all the airports. The airspace boundaries and altitudes assigned to a terminal control center, which vary widely from airport to airport, are based on factors such as traffic flows, neighboring airports and terrain.

Terminal controllers are responsible for providing all ATC services within their airspace. Traffic flow is broadly divided into departures, arrivals, and overflights. As aircraft move in and out of the terminal airspace, they are handed off to the next appropriate control facility (a control tower, an en-route control facility, or a bordering terminal or approach control). Terminal control is responsible for ensuring that aircraft are at an appropriate altitude when they are handed off, and that aircraft arrive at a suitable rate for landing.

Not all airports have a radar approach or terminal control available. In this case, the en-route center or a neighboring terminal or approach control may co-ordinate directly with the tower on the airport and vector inbound aircraft to a position from where they can land visually. At some of these airports, the tower may provide a non-radar procedural approach service to arriving aircraft handed over from a radar unit before they are visual to land. Some units also have a dedicated approach unit which can provide the procedural approach service either all the time or for any periods of radar outage for any reason.

In the U.S., TRACONs are additionally designated by a three-digit alphanumeric code. For example, the Chicago TRACON is designated C90.

Area control center/en-route center

ATC provides services to aircraft in flight between airports as well. Pilots fly under one of two sets of rules for separation: visual flight rules (VFR) or instrument flight rules (IFR). Air traffic controllers have different responsibilities to aircraft operating under the different sets of rules. While IFR flights are under positive control, in the US and Canada VFR pilots can request flight following, which provides traffic advisory services on a time permitting basis and may also provide assistance in avoiding areas of weather and flight restrictions, as well as allowing pilots into the ATC system prior to the need to a clearance into certain airspace. Across Europe, pilots may request for a "Flight Information Service", which is similar to flight following. In the UK it is known as a "basic service".

En-route air traffic controllers issue clearances and instructions for airborne aircraft, and pilots are required to comply with these instructions. En-route controllers also provide air traffic control services to many smaller airports around the country, including clearance off of the ground and clearance for approach to an airport. Controllers adhere to a set of separation standards that define the minimum distance allowed between aircraft. These distances vary depending on the equipment and procedures used in providing ATC services.

General characteristics
En-route air traffic controllers work in facilities called air traffic control centers, each of which is commonly referred to as a "center". The United States uses the equivalent term air route traffic control center. Each center is responsible for a given flight information region (FIR). Each flight information region covers many thousands of square miles of airspace and the airports within that airspace. Centers control IFR aircraft from the time they depart from an airport or terminal area's airspace to the time they arrive at another airport or terminal area's airspace. Centers may also "pick up" VFR aircraft that are already airborne and integrate them into the system. These aircraft must continue under VFR flight rules until the center provides a clearance.

Center controllers are responsible for issuing instructions to pilots to climb their aircraft to their assigned altitude while, at the same time, ensuring that the aircraft is properly separated from all other aircraft in the immediate area. Additionally, the aircraft must be placed in a flow consistent with the aircraft's route of flight. This effort is complicated by crossing traffic, severe weather, special missions that require large airspace allocations, and traffic density. When the aircraft approaches its destination, the center is responsible for issuing instructions to pilots so that they will meet altitude restrictions by specific points, as well as providing many destination airports with a traffic flow, which prohibits all of the arrivals being "bunched together". These "flow restrictions" often begin in the middle of the route, as controllers will position aircraft landing in the same destination so that when the aircraft are close to their destination they are sequenced.

As an aircraft reaches the boundary of a center's control area it is "handed off" or "handed over" to the next area control center. In some cases this "hand-off" process involves a transfer of identification and details between controllers so that air traffic control services can be provided in a seamless manner; in other cases local agreements may allow "silent handovers" such that the receiving center does not require any co-ordination if traffic is presented in an agreed manner. After the hand-off, the aircraft is given a frequency change and begins talking to the next controller. This process continues until the aircraft is handed off to a terminal controller ("approach").

Radar coverage
Since centers control a large airspace area, they will typically use long range radar that has the capability, at higher altitudes, to see aircraft within  of the radar antenna. They may also use radar data to control when it provides a better "picture" of the traffic or when it can fill in a portion of the area not covered by the long range radar.

In the U.S. system, at higher altitudes, over 90% of the U.S. airspace is covered by radar and often by multiple radar systems; however, coverage may be inconsistent at lower altitudes used by aircraft due to high terrain or distance from radar facilities. A center may require numerous radar systems to cover the airspace assigned to them, and may also rely on pilot position reports from aircraft flying below the floor of radar coverage. This results in a large amount of data being available to the controller. To address this, automation systems have been designed that consolidate the radar data for the controller. This consolidation includes eliminating duplicate radar returns, ensuring the best radar for each geographical area is providing the data, and displaying the data in an effective format.

Centers also exercise control over traffic travelling over the world's ocean areas. These areas are also flight information regions (FIRs). Because there are no radar systems available for oceanic control, oceanic controllers provide ATC services using procedural control. These procedures use aircraft position reports, time, altitude, distance, and speed to ensure separation. Controllers record information on flight progress strips and in specially developed oceanic computer systems as aircraft report positions. This process requires that aircraft be separated by greater distances, which reduces the overall capacity for any given route. See for example the North Atlantic Track system.

Some air navigation service providers (e.g., Airservices Australia, the U.S. Federal Aviation Administration, Nav Canada, etc.) have implemented automatic dependent surveillance – broadcast (ADS-B) as part of their surveillance capability. This new technology reverses the radar concept. Instead of radar "finding" a target by interrogating the transponder, the ADS-B equipped aircraft sends a position report as determined by the navigation equipment on board the aircraft. ADS-C is another mode of automatic dependent surveillance, however ADS-C operates in the "contract" mode where the aircraft reports a position, automatically or initiated by the pilot, based on a predetermined time interval. It is also possible for controllers to request more frequent reports to more quickly establish aircraft position for specific reasons. However, since the cost for each report is charged by the ADS service providers to the company operating the aircraft, more frequent reports are not commonly requested except in emergency situations. ADS-C is significant because it can be used where it is not possible to locate the infrastructure for a radar system (e.g., over water). Computerized radar displays are now being designed to accept ADS-C inputs as part of the display. This technology is currently used in portions of the North Atlantic and the Pacific by a variety of states who share responsibility for the control of this airspace.

Precision approach radars (PAR) are commonly used by military controllers of air forces of several countries, to assist the pilot in final phases of landing in places where instrument landing system and other sophisticated airborne equipment are unavailable to assist the pilots in marginal or near zero visibility conditions. This procedure is also called talkdowns.

A radar archive system (RAS) keeps an electronic record of all radar information, preserving it for a few weeks. This information can be useful for search and rescue. When an aircraft has 'disappeared' from radar screens, a controller can review the last radar returns from the aircraft to determine its likely position. For example, see this crash report. RAS is also useful to technicians who are maintaining radar systems.

Flight traffic mapping
The mapping of flights in real-time is based on the air traffic control system, and volunteer ADS-B receivers. In 1991, data on the location of aircraft was made available by the Federal Aviation Administration to the airline industry. The National Business Aviation Association (NBAA), the General Aviation Manufacturers Association, the Aircraft Owners and Pilots Association, the Helicopter Association International, and the National Air Transportation Association petitioned the FAA to make ASDI information available on a "need-to-know" basis. Subsequently, NBAA advocated the broad-scale dissemination of air traffic data. The Aircraft Situational Display to Industry (ASDI) system now conveys up-to-date flight information to the airline industry and the public. Some companies that distribute ASDI information are FlightExplorer, FlightView, and FlyteComm. Each company maintains a website that provides free updated information to the public on flight status. Stand-alone programs are also available for displaying the geographic location of airborne IFR (instrument flight rules) air traffic anywhere in the FAA air traffic system. Positions are reported for both commercial and general aviation traffic. The programs can overlay air traffic with a wide selection of maps such as, geo-political boundaries, air traffic control center boundaries, high altitude jet routes, satellite cloud and radar imagery.

Problems

Traffic

The day-to-day problems faced by the air traffic control system are primarily related to the volume of air traffic demand placed on the system and weather. Several factors dictate the amount of traffic that can land at an airport in a given amount of time. Each landing aircraft must touch down, slow, and exit the runway before the next crosses the approach end of the runway. This process requires at least one and up to four minutes for each aircraft. Allowing for departures between arrivals, each runway can thus handle about 30 arrivals per hour. A large airport with two arrival runways can handle about 60 arrivals per hour in good weather. Problems begin when airlines schedule more arrivals into an airport than can be physically handled, or when delays elsewhere cause groups of aircraft – that would otherwise be separated in time – to arrive simultaneously. Aircraft must then be delayed in the air by holding over specified locations until they may be safely sequenced to the runway. Up until the 1990s, holding, which has significant environmental and cost implications, was a routine occurrence at many airports. Advances in computers now allow the sequencing of planes hours in advance. Thus, planes may be delayed before they even take off (by being given a "slot"), or may reduce speed in flight and proceed more slowly thus significantly reducing the amount of holding.

Air traffic control errors occur when the separation (either vertical or horizontal) between airborne aircraft falls below the minimum prescribed separation set (for the domestic United States) by the US Federal Aviation Administration. Separation minimums for terminal control areas (TCAs) around airports are lower than en-route standards. Errors generally occur during periods following times of intense activity, when controllers tend to relax and overlook the presence of traffic and conditions that lead to loss of minimum separation.

Weather

Beyond runway capacity issues, the weather is a major factor in traffic capacity. Rain, ice, snow or hail on the runway cause landing aircraft to take longer to slow and exit, thus reducing the safe arrival rate and requiring more space between landing aircraft. Fog also requires a decrease in the landing rate. These, in turn, increase airborne delay for holding aircraft. If more aircraft are scheduled than can be safely and efficiently held in the air, a ground delay program may be established, delaying aircraft on the ground before departure due to conditions at the arrival airport.

In Area Control Centers, a major weather problem is thunderstorms, which present a variety of hazards to aircraft. Aircraft will deviate around storms, reducing the capacity of the en-route system by requiring more space per aircraft or causing congestion as many aircraft try to move through a single hole in a line of thunderstorms. Occasionally weather considerations cause delays to aircraft prior to their departure as routes are closed by thunderstorms.

Much money has been spent on creating software to streamline this process. However, at some ACCs, air traffic controllers still record data for each flight on strips of paper and personally coordinate their paths. In newer sites, these flight progress strips have been replaced by electronic data presented on computer screens. As new equipment is brought in, more and more sites are upgrading away from paper flight strips.

Congestion 
Constrained control capacity and growing traffic lead to flight cancellation and delays:

 In America, delays caused by ATC grew by 69% between 2012 and 2017. ATC staffing issues were a major factor in congestion.
 In China, the average delay per domestic flight spiked by 50% in 2017 to 15 minutes per flight.
 In Europe, en route delays grew by 105% in 2018, due to a lack of capacity or staff (60%), weather (25%) or strikes (14%), costing the European economy €17.6bn ($20.8bn), up by 28% on 2017.
By then the market for air-traffic services was worth $14bn.
More efficient ATC could save 5-10% of aviation fuel by avoiding holding patterns and indirect airways.

The military takes 80% of Chinese air space, congesting the thin corridors open to airliners.
Britain is closing military air space only during air-force exercises.

Callsigns
A prerequisite to safe air traffic separation is the assignment and use of distinctive call signs. These are permanently allocated by ICAO on request usually to scheduled flights and some air forces and other military services for military flights. There are written callsigns with a 3-letter combination followed by the flight number such as AAL872 or VLG1011. As such they appear on flight plans and ATC radar labels. There are also the audio or Radiotelephony callsigns used on the radio contact between pilots and air traffic control. These are not always identical to their written counterparts. An example of an audio callsign would be "Speedbird 832", instead of the written "BAW832". This is used to reduce the chance of confusion between ATC and the aircraft. By default, the callsign for any other flight is the registration number (tail number) of the aircraft, such as "N12345", "C-GABC" or "EC-IZD". The short Radiotelephony callsigns for these tail numbers is the last 3 letters using the NATO phonetic alphabet (e.g. ABC spoken alpha-bravo-charlie for C-GABC) or the last 3 numbers (e.g. three-four-five for N12345). In the United States, the prefix may be an aircraft type, model or manufacturer in place of the first registration character, for example, "N11842" could become "Cessna 842". This abbreviation is only allowed after communications have been established in each sector.

Before around 1980 International Air Transport Association (IATA) and ICAO were using the same 2-letter callsigns. Due to the larger number of new airlines after deregulation, ICAO established the 3-letter callsigns as mentioned above. The IATA callsigns are currently used in aerodromes on the announcement tables but are no longer used in air traffic control. For example, AA is the IATA callsign for American Airlines; the ATC equivalent is AAL. Flight numbers in regular commercial flights are designated by the aircraft operator and identical callsign might be used for the same scheduled journey each day it is operated, even if the departure time varies a little across different days of the week. The callsign of the return flight often differs only by the final digit from the outbound flight. Generally, airline flight numbers are even if eastbound, and odd if westbound. In order to reduce the possibility of two callsigns on one frequency at any time sounding too similar, a number of airlines, particularly in Europe, have started using alphanumeric callsigns that are not based on flight numbers (e.g. DLH23LG, spoken as Lufthansa-two-three-lima-golf, to prevent confusion between incoming DLH23 and outgoing DLH24 in the same frequency). Additionally, it is the right of the air traffic controller to change the 'audio' callsign for the period the flight is in his sector if there is a risk of confusion, usually choosing the tail number instead.

Technology
Many technologies are used in air traffic control systems. Primary and secondary radar are used to enhance a controller's situation awareness within his assigned airspace – all types of aircraft send back primary echoes of varying sizes to controllers' screens as radar energy is bounced off their skins, and transponder-equipped aircraft reply to secondary radar interrogations by giving an ID (Mode A), an altitude (Mode C) and/or a unique callsign (Mode S). Certain types of weather may also register on the radar screen.

These inputs, added to data from other radars, are correlated to build the air situation. Some basic processing occurs on the radar tracks, such as calculating ground speed and magnetic headings.

Usually, a flight data processing system manages all the flight plan related data, incorporating – in a low or high degree – the information of the track once the correlation between them (flight plan and track) is established. All this information is distributed to modern operational display systems, making it available to controllers.

The FAA has spent over US$3 billion on software, but a fully automated system is still yet to be achieved. In 2002 the UK brought a new area control centre into service at the London Area Control Centre, Swanwick, Hampshire, relieving a busy suburban centre at West Drayton, Middlesex, north of London Heathrow Airport. Software from Lockheed-Martin predominates at the London Area Control Centre. However, the centre was initially troubled by software and communications problems causing delays and occasional shutdowns.

Some tools are available in different domains to help the controller further:
 Flight data processing systems: this is the system (usually one per center) that processes all the information related to the flight (the flight plan), typically in the time horizon from gate to gate (airport departure/arrival gates). It uses such processed information to invoke other flight plan related tools (such as e.g. MTCD), and distributes such processed information to all the stakeholders (air traffic controllers, collateral centers, airports, etc.).
 Short-term conflict alert (STCA) that checks possible conflicting trajectories in a time horizon of about 2 or 3 minutes (or even less in approach context – 35 seconds in the French Roissy & Orly approach centres) and alerts the controller prior to the loss of separation. The algorithms used may also provide in some systems a possible vectoring solution, that is, the manner in which to turn, descend, increase/decrease speed, or climb the aircraft in order to avoid infringing the minimum safety distance or altitude clearance.
 Minimum safe altitude warning (MSAW): a tool that alerts the controller if an aircraft appears to be flying too low to the ground or will impact terrain based on its current altitude and heading.
System coordination (SYSCO) to enable controller to negotiate the release of flights from one sector to another.
Area penetration warning (APW) to inform a controller that a flight will penetrate a restricted area.
Arrival and departure manager to help sequence the takeoff and landing of aircraft.
The departure manager (DMAN): A system aid for the ATC at airports, that calculates a planned departure flow with the goal to maintain an optimal throughput at the runway, reduce queuing at holding point and distribute the information to various stakeholders at the airport (i.e. the airline, ground handling and air traffic control (ATC)).
The arrival manager (AMAN): A system aid for the ATC at airports, that calculates a planned arrival flow with the goal to maintain an optimal throughput at the runway, reduce arrival queuing and distribute the information to various stakeholders.
 Passive final approach spacing tool (pFAST), a CTAS tool, provides runway assignment and sequence number advisories to terminal controllers to improve the arrival rate at congested airports. pFAST was deployed and operational at five US TRACONs before being cancelled. NASA research included an active FAST capability that also provided vector and speed advisories to implement the runway and sequence advisories.
Converging runway display aid (CRDA) enables approach controllers to run two final approaches that intersect and make sure that go arounds are minimized.
Center TRACON automation system (CTAS) is a suite of human centered decision support tools developed by NASA Ames Research Center. Several of the CTAS tools have been field tested and transitioned to the FAA for operational evaluation and use. Some of the CTAS tools are: traffic management advisor (TMA), passive final approach spacing tool (pFAST), collaborative arrival planning (CAP), direct-to (D2), en route descent advisor (EDA) and multi-center TMA. The software is running on Linux.
 Traffic management advisor (TMA), a CTAS tool, is an en route decision support tool that automates time based metering solutions to provide an upper limit of aircraft to a TRACON from the center over a set period of time. Schedules are determined that will not exceed the specified arrival rate and controllers use the scheduled times to provide the appropriate delay to arrivals while in the en route domain. This results in an overall reduction in en route delays and also moves the delays to more efficient airspace (higher altitudes) than occur if holding near the TRACON boundary, which is required in order to prevent overloading the TRACON controllers. TMA is operational at most en route air route traffic control centers (ARTCCs) and continues to be enhanced to address more complex traffic situations (e.g. adjacent center metering (ACM) and en route departure capability (EDC))
 MTCD & URET
In the US, user request evaluation tool (URET) takes paper strips out of the equation for en route controllers at ARTCCs by providing a display that shows all aircraft that are either in or currently routed into the sector.
In Europe, several MTCD tools are available:  (NATS), VAFORIT (DFS), new FDPS (MUAC). The SESAR programme should soon launch new MTCD concepts.
URET and MTCD provide conflict advisories up to 30 minutes in advance and have a suite of assistance tools that assist in evaluating resolution options and pilot requests.
Mode S: provides a data downlink of flight parameters via secondary surveillance radars allowing radar processing systems and therefore controllers to see various data on a flight, including airframe unique id (24-bits encoded), indicated airspeed and flight director selected level, amongst others.
CPDLC: controller-pilot data link communications – allows digital messages to be sent between controllers and pilots, avoiding the need to use radiotelephony. It is especially useful in areas where difficult-to-use HF radiotelephony was previously used for communication with aircraft, e.g. oceans. This is currently in use in various parts of the world including the Atlantic and Pacific oceans.
ADS-B: automatic dependent surveillance broadcast – provides a data downlink of various flight parameters to air traffic control systems via the transponder (1090 MHz) and reception of those data by other aircraft in the vicinity. The most important is the aircraft's latitude, longitude and level: such data can be utilized to create a radar-like display of aircraft for controllers and thus allows a form of pseudo-radar control to be done in areas where the installation of radar is either prohibitive on the grounds of low traffic levels, or technically not feasible (e.g. oceans). This is currently in use in Australia, Canada and parts of the Pacific Ocean and Alaska.
The electronic flight strip system (e-strip):

A system of electronic flight strips replacing the old paper strips is being used by several service providers, such as Nav Canada, MASUAC, DFS, DECEA. E-strips allows controllers to manage electronic flight data online without paper strips, reducing the need for manual functions, creating new tools and reducing the ATCO's workload. The firsts electronic flight strips systems were independently and simultaneously invented and implemented by Nav Canada and Saipher ATC in 1999. The Nav Canada system known as EXCDS and rebranded in 2011 to NAVCANstrips and Saipher's first generation system known as SGTC, which is now being updated by its 2nd generation system, the TATIC TWR. DECEA in Brazil is the world's largest user of tower e-strips system, ranging from very small airports up to the busiest ones, taking the advantage of real time information and data collection from each of more than 150 sites for use in air traffic flow management (ATFM), billing and statistics.
 Screen content recording: Hardware or software based recording function which is part of most modern automation system and that captures the screen content shown to the ATCO. Such recordings are used for a later replay together with audio recording for investigations and post event analysis.
 Communication navigation surveillance / air traffic management (CNS/ATM) systems are communications, navigation, and surveillance systems, employing digital technologies, including satellite systems together with various levels of automation, applied in support of a seamless global air traffic management system.

Air navigation service providers (ANSPs) and air traffic service providers (ATSPs)

 Azerbaijan – AzərAeroNaviqasiya
 Albania – Albcontrol
 Algeria – Etablissement National de la Navigation Aérienne (ENNA)
 Argentina - Empresa Argentina de Navegación Aérea (EANA)
 Armenia – Armenian Air Traffic Services (ARMATS)
 Australia – Airservices Australia (Government owned Corporation) and Royal Australian Air Force
 Austria – Austro Control
 Bangladesh- Civil Aviation Authority, Bangladesh
 Belarus – Republican Unitary Enterprise "Белаэронавигация (Belarusian Air Navigation)"
 Belgium – Skeyes - Authority of Airways
 Bosnia and Herzegovina – Agencija za pružanje usluga u zračnoj plovidbi (Bosnia and Herzegovina Air Navigation Services Agency)
 Brazil – Departamento de Controle do Espaço Aéreo (ATC/ATM Authority) and ANAC – Agência Nacional de Aviação Civil (Civil Aviation Authority)
 Bulgaria – Air Traffic Services Authority
 Cambodia – Cambodia Air Traffic Services (CATS)
 Canada – Nav Canada – formerly provided by Transport Canada and Canadian Forces
 Cayman Islands – CIAA Cayman Islands Airports Authority
 Central America – Corporación Centroamericana de Servicios de Navegación Aérea
 Guatemala – Dirección General de Aeronáutica Civil (DGAC)
 El Salvador
 Honduras
 Nicaragua – Empresa Administradora Aeropuertos Internacionales (EAAI)
 Costa Rica – Dirección General de Aviación Civil
 Belize
 Chile – Dirección General de Aeronáutica Civil (DGAC)
 Colombia – Aeronáutica Civil Colombiana (UAEAC)
 Croatia – Hrvatska kontrola zračne plovidbe (Croatia Control Ltd.)
 Cuba – Instituto de Aeronáutica Civil de Cuba (IACC)
 Czech Republic – Řízení letového provozu ČR
 Cyprus - Department of Civil Aviation
 Denmark – Naviair (Danish ATC)
 Dominican Republic – Instituto Dominicano de Aviación Civil (IDAC) "Dominican Institute of Civil Aviation"
 Eastern Caribbean – Eastern Caribbean Civil Aviation Authority (ECCAA)
 Anguilla
 Antigua and Barbuda
 British Virgin Islands
 Dominica
 Grenada
 Saint Kitts and Nevis
 Saint Lucia
 Saint Vincent and the Grenadines
 Ecuador – Dirección General de Aviación Civil (DGAC) "General Direction of Civil Aviation" Government Body
 Estonia – Estonian Air Navigation Services
 Europe – Eurocontrol (European Organisation for the Safety of Air Navigation)
 Fiji - Fiji Airports (fully owned Government Commercial Company)
 Finland – Finavia
 France – Direction Générale de l'Aviation Civile (DGAC) : Direction des Services de la Navigation Aérienne (DSNA) (Government body)
 Georgia – SAKAERONAVIGATSIA, Ltd. (Georgian Air Navigation)
 Germany – Deutsche Flugsicherung (German ATC – State-owned company)
 Greece – Hellenic Civil Aviation Authority (HCAA)
 Hong Kong – Civil Aviation Department (CAD)
 Hungary – HungaroControl Magyar Légiforgalmi Szolgálat Zrt. (HungaroControl Hungarian Air Navigation Services Pte. Ltd. Co.)
 Iceland – ISAVIA
 Indonesia – AirNav Indonesia
 Iran - Iran Civil Aviation Organization (ICAO)
 Ireland – Irish Aviation Authority (IAA)
 India – Airports Authority of India (AAI) (under Ministry of Civil Aviation, Government of India and Indian Air Force)
 Iraq – Iraqi Air Navigation – ICAA 
 Israel – Israeli Airports Authority (IIA) 
 Italy – ENAV SpA and Italian Air Force
 Jamaica – JCAA (Jamaica Civil Aviation Authority)
 Japan – JCAB (Japan Civil Aviation Bureau)
 Kenya – KCAA (Kenya Civil Aviation Authority)
 Latvia – LGS (Latvian ATC)
 Lithuania – ANS (Lithuanian ATC)
 Luxembourg – Administration de la navigation aérienne (ANA – government administration)
 Macedonia – DGCA (Macedonian ATC)
 Malaysia – Civil Aviation Authority of Malaysia (CAAM)
 Malta – Malta Air Traffic Services Ltd
 Mexico – Servicios a la Navegación en el Espacio Aéreo Mexicano
 Morocco - Office National Des Aeroports (ONDA)
 Nepal – Civil Aviation Authority of Nepal
 Netherlands – Luchtverkeersleiding Nederland (LVNL) (Dutch ATC) Eurocontrol (Maastricht Upper Area Control Centre)
 New Zealand – Airways New Zealand (State owned enterprise)
 Nigeria - Nigeria Civil Aviation Authority (NCAA)
 Norway – Avinor (State-owned private company)
 Oman – Directorate General of Meteorology & Air Navigation (Government of Oman)
 Pakistan – Civil Aviation Authority (under Government of Pakistan)
 Peru – Centro de Instrucción de Aviación Civil CIAC Civil Aviation Training Center
 Philippines – Civil Aviation Authority of the Philippines (CAAP) (under the Philippine Government)
 Poland – Polish Air Navigation Services Agency (PANSA)
 Portugal – NAV (Portuguese ATC)
 Puerto Rico – Administracion Federal de Aviacion
 Romania – Romanian Air Traffic Services Administration (ROMATSA)
 Russia – Federal State Unitary Enterprise "State ATM Corporation"
 Saudi Arabia – Saudi Air Navigation Services (SANS)
 Seychelles – Seychelles Civil Aviation Authority (SCAA)
 Singapore – Civil Aviation Authority of Singapore (CAAS)
 Serbia – Serbia and Montenegro Air Traffic Services Agency Ltd. (SMATSA)
 Slovakia – Letové prevádzkové služby Slovenskej republiky
 Slovenia – Slovenia Control
 South Africa – Air Traffic and Navigation Services (ATNS)
 South Korea – Korea Office of Civil Aviation
 Spain – AENA now AENA S.A. (Spanish Airports) and ENAIRE (ATC & ATSP)
 Sri Lanka – Airport & Aviation Services (Sri Lanka) Limited (Government owned company)
 Sweden – LFV (government body)
 Switzerland – Skyguide
 Taiwan – ANWS (Civil Aeronautical Administration)
 Thailand – AEROTHAI (Aeronautical Radio of Thailand)
 Trinidad and Tobago – Trinidad and Tobago Civil Aviation Authority (TTCAA)
 Turkey – General Directorate of State Airports Authority (DHMI)
 United Arab Emirates – General Civil Aviation Authority (GCAA)
 United Kingdom – National Air Traffic Services (NATS) (49% State owned public-private partnership)
 United States – Federal Aviation Administration (FAA) (government body)
 Ukraine – Ukrainian State Air Traffic Service Enterprise (UkSATSE)
 Venezuela – Instituto Nacional de Aeronautica Civil (INAC)
 Zambia - Zambia Civil Aviation Authority (ZCAA)
 Zimbabwe - Zimbabwe Civil Aviation Authority

Proposed changes
In the United States, some alterations to traffic control procedures are being examined:
 The Next Generation Air Transportation System examines how to overhaul the United States national airspace system.
 Free flight is a developing air traffic control method that uses no centralized control (e.g. air traffic controllers). Instead, parts of airspace are reserved dynamically and automatically in a distributed way using computer communication to ensure the required separation between aircraft.

In Europe, the SESAR (Single European Sky ATM Research) programme plans to develop new methods, technologies, procedures, and systems to accommodate future (2020 and beyond) air traffic needs.
In October 2018, European controller unions dismissed setting targets to improve ATC as "a waste of time and effort" as new technology could cut costs for users but threaten their jobs.
In April 2019, the EU called for a "Digital European Sky", focusing on cutting costs by including a common digitisation standard and allowing controllers to move to where they are needed instead of merging national ATCs, as it would not solve all problems.
Single air-traffic control services in continent-sized America and China does not alleviate congestion.
Eurocontrol tries to reduce delays by diverting flights to less busy routes: flight paths across Europe were redesigned to accommodate the new airport in Istanbul, which opened in April, but the extra capacity will be absorbed by rising demand for air travel.

Well-paid jobs in Western Europe could move east with cheaper labour.
The average Spanish controller earn over €200,000 a year, over seven times the country average salary, more than pilots, and at least ten controllers were paid over €810,000 ($1.1m) a year in 2010.
French controllers spent a cumulative nine months on strike between 2004 and 2016.

Privatization
Many countries have also privatized or corporatized their air navigation service providers. There are several models that can be used for ATC service providers. The first is to have the ATC services be part of a government agency as is currently the case in the United States. The problem with this model is that funding can be inconsistent and can disrupt the development and operation of services. Sometimes funding can disappear when lawmakers cannot approve budgets in time. Both proponents and opponents of privatization recognize that stable funding is one of the major factors for successful upgrades of ATC infrastructure. Some of the funding issues include sequestration and politicization of projects. Proponents argue that moving ATC services to a private corporation could stabilize funding over the long term which will result in more predictable planning and rollout of new technology as well as training of personnel.

Another model is to have ATC services provided by a government corporation. This model is used in Germany, where funding is obtained through user fees. Yet another model is to have a for-profit corporation operate ATC services. This is the model used in the United Kingdom, but there have been several issues with the system there including a large-scale failure in December 2014 which caused delays and cancellations and has been attributed to cost-cutting measures put in place by this corporation. In fact, earlier that year, the corporation owned by the German government won the bid to provide ATC services for Gatwick Airport in the United Kingdom. The last model, which is often the suggested model for the United States to transition to is to have a non-profit organization that would handle ATC services as is used in Canada.

The Canadian system is the one most often used as a model by proponents of privatization. Air traffic control privatization has been successful in Canada with the creation of Nav Canada, a private nonprofit organization which has reduced costs and has allowed new technologies to be deployed faster due to the elimination of much of the bureaucratic red tape. This has resulted in shorter flights and less fuel usage. It has also resulted in flights being safer due to new technology. Nav Canada is funded from fees that are collected from the airlines based on the weight of the aircraft and the distance flown.

ATC is operated by national governments with few exceptions: in the European Union, only Italy has private shareholders.
Privatisation does not guarantee lower prices: the profit margin of MUAC was 70% in 2017, as there is no competition, but governments could offer fixed terms concessions.
Australia, Fiji and New Zealand run the upper-air space for the Pacific islands' governments.
HungaroControl offers remote airport tower services from Budapest, and since 2014 provides upper air space management for Kosovo.

ATC regulations in the United States
The United States airspace is divided into 21 zones (centers), and each zone is divided into sectors. Also within each zone are portions of airspace, about 50 miles (80.5 km) in diameter, called TRACON (Terminal Radar Approach Control) airspaces. Within each TRACON airspace are a number of airports, each of which has its own airspace with a 5-mile (8-km) radius. FAA control tower operators (CTO) / air traffic controllers use FAA Order 7110.65 as the authority for all procedures regarding air traffic.

See also 

Air traffic service
Flight information service officer
Flight planning
ICAO recommendations on use of the International System of Units
Forward air control
Global air-traffic management
RMCDE
Tower en route control (TEC)
List of tallest air traffic control towers in the United States

References

External links

U.S. Centennial of Flight Commission – Air Traffic Control

NASA video of US air traffic

 
Radar